R. Rex Parris is an American attorney and the current mayor of Lancaster, California.

Early life and education 
Raymond "Rex" Parris Jr., the third of four boys, was born in 1952 to Raymond Parris and Jeanne Powers in Palmdale, CA. His parents separated in 1963 after Raymond lost his leg in a motorcycle accident. Finding his mother's income as a waitress to be insufficient, Rex Parris began working at age 14 while still in school. He left high school in 10th grade to work full-time as a busboy.

Parris attended Antelope Valley College before eventually transferring to the University of California at Santa Barbara, where he was accepted into the Scholar's Program and majored in Law & Society. He went on to receive his Juris Doctor from Southwestern School of Law in 1980.

He has been a member of the California State Bar since 1980.

Career

Law 
In 1985, R. Rex Parris founded the PARRIS Law Firm with his wife Carrol in Lancaster, California. Today the firm's practice covers most areas of personal injury law, including car accidents, workplace injuries, premises liability. It also handles toxic torts, environmental law and employment class actions.

In 2009, Parris was lead counsel in obtaining a $370 million jury verdict against Georges Marciano, founder of Guess.

In 2021, he obtained a $120 million verdict in a traffic accident case.

PARRIS Law Firm, together with Panish, Shea & Boyle and other plaintiffs’ counsel, represented the residents of Porter Ranch, CA, following the Aliso Canyon gas leak. In 2021, Southern California Gas Company and its parent company Sempra Energy settled for $1.8 billion.

Parris regularly speaks at trial lawyer associations and continuing legal education (CLE) seminars throughout the United States. He frequently is the keynote speaker at events sponsored by the Trial Lawyers University.

Philanthropy 
R. Rex Parris High School in Palmdale, California is named for the philanthropy of Parris.

In 2014, Parris and his wife Carrol established the Parris Institute for Professional Excellence at Pepperdine University with a gift of $2.2 million.

Rex and Carrol are significant donors for longevity research at USC.

Other business interests 
R Rex Parris is the chairman of the board for CarthroniX, a biotech firm working to develop several drugs that treat arthritis, pulmonary fibrosis, multiple sclerosis, and other conditions.

Mayor of Lancaster, California

Elections 
R. Rex Parris was first elected mayor of Lancaster, California in April 2008. He was subsequently re-elected in April 2010, 2012, 2016, and 2020. In 2020, Parris won a fifth term as mayor with 69 percent of the vote.

Tenure 
As mayor, Parris in 2010 launched an economic development division that attracted manufacturing company BYD (makers of electric buses and advanced battery technology).

Parris was involved with many city initiatives, including the Lancaster Wellness Homes and YOLO Lancaster.

Supported by a unanimous 2021 vote by the City Council, Parris led efforts to start a public health agency specifically for Lancaster. These efforts came after a vote of no confidence was issued against the LA County Department of Public Health during the COVID-19 pandemic.

Green energy 
Since his election, Parris has taken steps to make Lancaster a "Net Zero City." In 2015, Lancaster became the first city in the world to generate more clean energy than it consumes and require all new housing to be net zero.

In July 2010, the City of Lancaster partnered with SolarCity to launch the Solar Lancaster program, a solar financing program for homeowners, business owners and nonprofit organizations. In 2015, Parris and the City of Lancaster launched Lancaster Choice Energy, a nonprofit locally-run energy company for Lancaster businesses and residents.

Lancaster's Antelope Valley Transportation Agency is the first public bus agency with 100% of their fleet electric buses.

Controversies 
Throughout his tenure, Parris has been known for a history of controversial remarks.

 He once proposed a $32 million, 10-story Buddha statue complex to help welcome Chinese companies.
 In 2011, with the city shouldering a disproportionate share of Section 8 housing, Parris accused the Los Angeles County Housing Authority of using the city as a dumping ground for the poor and homeless.
 He has strong views on mask wearing and advocacy of mandatory COVID-19 vaccines.
 He told Vice magazine in 2017 that increasing the Asian population and members of the LGBTQ can help bring down crime rates and increase education levels.

Parris is a frequent keynote speaker on climate change at conferences throughout the world. The United States Environmental Protection Agency the city of Lancaster in 2019 with its Greenpower Leadership Award.

President Donald Trump visited the city of Lancaster on February 18, 2020, accompanied by House Minority Leader Kevin McCarthy. Parris met with Trump, and described him as "incredibly charming" and having a "magnetic personality". After the 2021 storming of the United States Capitol, Parris reflected on the experience, describing himself as being "horrified" and his view of the Capitol as "almost sacrosanct."

Personal life 
Parris is married to his wife Carrol, with whom he has four children. They have six grandchildren. Two of their sons, Khail and Rutger, continue to work at PARRIS Law Firm. Parris’ brother, Robert Parris, a former CHP officer, has been an attorney with the firm since 1992.

Parris purchased a home previously owned by Lee Iacocca in Laguna Beach, California in April 2020 for $6.6 million.

References 

1952 births
Living people
Philanthropists from California
University of California, Santa Barbara alumni
Southwestern Law School alumni
21st-century American lawyers
Antelope Valley College alumni
21st-century American politicians
20th-century American lawyers
California lawyers
People from Lancaster, California
Mayors of places in California